Yorouk may refer to:

 Yörüks, also Yuruks or Yorouks, are a group of people, ultimately of Oghuz Turkic descent, some of whom are still nomadic, primarily inhabiting the mountains of Anatolia and partly Balkan peninsula.
 Yuruk rug, a kind of Turkish rug from Konya and Karaman regions.

Turkish words and phrases